Agonopterix silerella is a moth of the family Depressariidae. It is found in Italy, Switzerland and Austria.

The wingspan is 9–11 mm.

The larvae have been recorded feeding on Laserpitium siler and Laser trilobum.

References

External links
lepiforum.de

Moths described in 1865
Agonopterix
Moths of Europe